John Kingsmill (ca. 1536 – will proved 1590), of King's Enham, Hampshire, was an English politician.

He was a Member (MP) of the Parliament of England for Ludgershall in 1584 and 1586.

References

1536 births
1590 deaths
People from Andover, Hampshire
English MPs 1584–1585
English MPs 1586–1587